Aholcocerus is a genus of moths in the family Cossidae.

Species
 Aholcocerus ihleorum Yakovlev & Witt, 2009
 Aholcocerus ronkayorum Yakovlev, 2006
 Aholcocerus sevastopuloi Yakovlev, 2011
 Aholcocerus verbeeki (Roepke, 1957)

References

 , 2006, New Cossidae (Lepidoptera) from Asia, Africa and Macronesia, Tinea 19 (3): 188–213.
 , 2009: The Carpenter Moths (Lepidoptera:Cossidae) of Vietnam. Entomofauna Supplement 16: 11–32.

External links

 iNaturalist
Natural History Museum Lepidoptera generic names catalog

Cossinae
Cossidae genera